Hōne Paratene Tamanuiarangi (1821 – 30 April 1899), also known as John Patterson, was a Māori member of Parliament in New Zealand. He was one of four Māori elected in 1868 for the new Māori electorates in the New Zealand parliament

He represented the electorate of Southern Maori from 1868 to 1870 when he retired.

As a young man, Patterson was involved in whaling with Philip Ryan at Oashore Bay, south of Lake Forsyth on the southern coast of Banks Peninsula. He also participated in the West Coast Gold Rush of the mid-1860s. He died aged 78 years at Kaiapoi in 1899.

References

1820s births
1899 deaths
Ngāi Tahu people
New Zealand people in whaling
Members of the New Zealand House of Representatives
New Zealand MPs for Māori electorates
New Zealand MPs for South Island electorates
19th-century New Zealand politicians